Athemistus is a genus of longhorn beetles of the subfamily Lamiinae, containing the following species:

subgenus Athemistus
 Athemistus aberrans Carter, 1932
 Athemistus aborigine Carter, 1926
 Athemistus aethiops Pascoe, 1867
 Athemistus approximates Carter, 1926
 Athemistus armitagei Pascoe, 1866
 Athemistus barretti Carter, 1926 
 Athemistus bituberculatus Pascoe, 1867
 Athemistus cristatus Blackburn, 1894
 Athemistus dawsoni Breuning, 1970
 Athemistus funereus Pascoe, 1866
 Athemistus harrisoni Carter, 1926
 Athemistus howitti Pascoe, 1876
 Athemistus laevicollis Carter, 1926
 Athemistus luciae Carter, 1926
 Athemistus macleayi Carter, 1926
 Athemistus maculatus Carter, 1926
 Athemistus mastersi Carter, 1926
 Athemistus monticola Blackburn, 1894
 Athemistus murina (Breuning, 1940)
 Athemistus nodosus Carter, 1928
 Athemistus orbicollis Carter, 1937
 Athemistus pubescens Pascoe, 1862
 Athemistus puncticollis Pascoe, 1867
 Athemistus punctipennis Carter, 1926
 Athemistus rugulosus (Guérin-Méneville, 1831)
 Athemistus torridus Blackburn, 1894
 Athemistus tricolor Carter, 1926

subgenus Hoplathemistus
 Athemistus albofasciatus Aurivillius, 1917
 Athemistus assimilis Breuning, 1939
 Athemistus conifer Aurivillius, 1917

References

 
Parmenini